The Nasutitermitinae are a subfamily of higher termites that includes more than 80 genera.  They are most recognisable by the more highly derived soldier caste which exhibits vestigial mandibles and a protruding fontanellar process on the head from which they can "shoot" chemical weaponry. True workers of certain genera within this subfamily also exhibit a visible epicranial y suture, most notably found within the members of Nasutitermes. Notable genera include the notorious wood-eating Nasutitermes, and the conspicuous Hospitalitermes and Constrictotermes, both genera characterized by their behavior of forming large open-air foraging trails.

Genera 
The ''Termite Catalogue lists the following:

References

External links 
 Tree of Life (TolWeb)
 
 

Termites